Daan Noppen (Arnhem, 14 January 1977 – lives and works in Amsterdam) is a Dutch contemporary artist mainly working in drawing and photography. He is best known for his realistic larger than life drawings of portraits and bodies.

Exhibitions
Daan Noppen's work has been exhibited in:

2015
 Duo show together with Raphael Hermans, Compagnie theater, Amsterdam

2013
 Artist in residence The Nationale Reisopera, Enschede, Netherlands
 Group show Galerie14, Luxembourg city, Luxembourg

2012
 North Faces, Lele Gallery, Metz, France
 LC Projects Brooklyn, NY, United States

2008
 Arteamericas, Miami Beach FL, United States; Art fair with Hardcore gallery
 Arti08, The Hague, Netherlands
 Prinsengracht 88, Amsterdam, Group Photography exhibition
 Museo Ciudad de Mexico, Mexico City, Mexico; PUI Mexico
 Centro de Desarrollo de las Artes Visuales, Havana, (Cuba) PUI Cuba
 
2007
 Moore space, Miami, United States; (re-) Creating History, by Allard van Hoorn (collaboration on project)
 Artemis, Amsterdam, Netherlands
 Behance
 
2006
 Gallery Apart, Amsterdam, Netherlands
 Island 6, Shanghai, China; Hidden Layers, Electric Cities
 Club 11, Amsterdam, Netherlands
 
2005
 n8, Amsterdam, Netherlands

References

1977 births
Dutch artists
Living people
Artists from Amsterdam